District 55 of the Oregon House of Representatives is one of 60 House legislative districts in the state of Oregon. As of 2013, the boundary for the district includes all of Crook County and portions of Deschutes, Jackson, Klamath, and Lake counties. The current representative for the district is Republican Mike McLane of Powell Butte.

Election results
District boundaries have changed over time; therefore, representatives before 2013 may not represent the same constituency as today. General election results from 2000 to present are as follows:

See also
 Oregon Legislative Assembly
 Oregon House of Representatives

References

External links
 Oregon House of Representatives Official site
 Oregon Secretary of State: Redistricting Reform Task Force

Oregon House of Representatives districts
Crook County, Oregon
Deschutes County, Oregon
Jackson County, Oregon
Klamath County, Oregon
Lake County, Oregon